Masses & Mainstream, published from 1948 to 1963, was an American Marxist monthly publication. It resulted from a merger between New Masses, which ceased publication in January 1948, and Mainstream, a Communist cultural quarterly established the previous year. It was headquartered in New York City.

Masses & Mainstream was edited by Samuel Sillen. Although most of its best-known contributors had written for New Masses before the war, the magazine gave a platform to some younger writers, including Howard Fast, Thomas McGrath, Eve Merriam, Lloyd L. Brown and Phillip Bonosky.
 
The magazine had a circulation of 17,000 in 1948, but steadily lost subscribers through the McCarthy era.

References

Communist periodicals published in the United States
Monthly magazines published in the United States
Defunct political magazines published in the United States
Defunct literary magazines published in the United States
Magazines established in 1948
Magazines disestablished in 1963
Marxist magazines
Magazines published in New York City